Glen Lim Jun Wei (born 28 March 2002) is a Singaporean swimmer. He competed in the men's 400 metre freestyle at the 2019 World Aquatics Championships. He won the 400m freestyle at the Neo Garden 14th Singapore National Swimming Championships in 2019, breaking the national record of 3min 54.64sec and set a national record of 3min 54.12sec.

References

External links
 

2002 births
Living people
Singaporean male freestyle swimmers
Place of birth missing (living people)
Swimmers at the 2018 Asian Games
Asian Games bronze medalists for Singapore
Asian Games medalists in swimming
Medalists at the 2018 Asian Games
Southeast Asian Games bronze medalists for Singapore
Southeast Asian Games medalists in swimming
Competitors at the 2021 Southeast Asian Games
21st-century Singaporean people